The classical Japanese language ( bungo, "literary language"), also called "old writing" ( kobun), sometimes simply called "Medieval Japanese" is the literary form of the Japanese language that was the standard until the early Shōwa period (1926–1989). It is based on Early Middle Japanese, the language as spoken during the Heian period (794–1185), but exhibits some later influences. Its use started to decline during the late Meiji period (1868–1912) when novelists started writing their works in the spoken form. Eventually, the spoken style came into widespread use, including in major newspapers, but many official documents were still written in the old style. After the end of World War II, most documents switched to the spoken style, although the classical style continues to be used in traditional genres, such as haiku and waka. Old laws are also left in the classical style unless fully revised.

History 

Classical Japanese began to be written during the Heian period, at which point it was very similar to spoken Japanese. It became the written standard for the Japanese language for many centuries, though the spoken language continued to evolve and by the Edo period was substantially different from classical Japanese. This is known as diglossia, a situation in which two forms of a language, in this case a written and spoken form, coexist. During the Meiji period, some intellectuals sought the abolition of classical Japanese, such as the Genbun Itchi movement, which proposed that written Japanese conform to the vernacular spoken language. Futabatei Shimei's 1887 novel The Drifting Cloud was one of the first novels to be written in vernacular Japanese rather than classical. By 1908, novels no longer used classical Japanese, and by the 1920s the same was true of all newspapers. Government documents remained in classical Japanese until 1946. Classical Japanese continues to be taught in Japanese high schools and universities due to its importance in the study of traditional Japanese literature.

Orthography 

Classical Japanese is written in an orthography that differs from modern Japanese in two major ways. These are the usage of old character forms ( Kyūjitai) and historical kana usage ( Rekishi-teki kana-zukai).

Old character forms ( Kyūjitai) 

Old character forms are the forms of Chinese characters ( Kanji) used in Japan before the post-World War II spelling reforms there. The modern, simplified characters are called new character forms ( Shinjitai).

A few examples follow, with the old characters on the left and the new characters on the right:

 

Noted that the kana spelling of a kanji is not unique; e.g. Additionally in classical Japanese, ("change") and ("to change, modify"). The above spelling differences are etymological. For example,  is just a native Japanese word labeled by a Chinese character with similar meaning,  while  is totally a new word derived from the combination of original meanings of two Chinese characters( means "politics" and  means "body").

In cases like that of the first two, the entire original character has essentially been replaced by a new one, independent of the original's etymology. This type, however, is relatively rare. Another approach is to essentially replace the character with a piece of it, sometimes slightly altered, as in the third and fourth characters. Finally, probably the most common type of simplification is to change one component of the character to reduce the number of strokes and/or make it easier to write, a strategy exemplified by the fifth and sixth examples. Note that, as in the case of the sixth character, the simplification may be very subtle.

In general, old character forms are identical to their traditional Chinese counterparts, but there are some exceptions. For the seventh example character, the traditional and simplified Japanese versions coexisted as different forms of the same traditional character in Modern Chinese, while in Japan, what is now the new character form was at that time considered a variant and rarely used. And in a few cases, like that of the eighth character, the old character form has always been considered a rare variant in Modern Chinese.

Historical kana usage ( Rekishi-teki kana-zukai) 

Historical kana usage is the system of kana (i.e., phonetic character) writing used in Japan before the post-war reforms. More specifically, it is the version of kana orthography standardized in the Meiji Period (since before that time kana usage was not standardized). It is, broadly speaking, based on the pronunciation of Japanese in the Heian Period, the time-frame in which Early Middle Japanese (on which the grammar of classical Japanese is based) was spoken. There are several differences between historical kana usage — which is also referred to as "old kana usage" ( Kyū kana-zukai) — and the modern kana orthography, called "modern kana usage" ( Gendai kana-zukai) or "new kana usage" ( Shin kana-zukai). Some of these differences apply primarily to Sino-Japanese readings of Chinese characters, while others apply primarily to native Japanese words, and still others apply equally to both groups of words.

Broadly speaking, the differences are:

H-Row ( Ha-gyō) rule 

This rule primarily applies to native Japanese morphemes, although it is crucial to the mechanics of the long vowel rule that applies primarily to Sino-Japanese words, which is elaborated upon below.

Some examples follow (old spellings are on the left, new spellings on the right; kana in parenthesis represent the pronunciation of the preceding character):

There are some exceptions to this sound change, although they are rare. Sometimes, as in the case of the first two exceptions, the sound change form exists, usually with a slightly different meaning ( hawa is a hyper-formal and very respectful term for mother) or is used in different contexts ( hō is generally used in isolation, while  hoho is generally used in compounds). In other cases, as is true of the second two exceptions, the unchanged form is the only one that exists. In addition to these exceptions, some dialects may preserve these sounds as they were at any stage of the language.

W-row ( Wa-gyō) rule 

This rule applies equally to native and Sino-Japanese words.

Some examples:

Native Japanese words
  →  いる (only in kana) (wi-ru → i-ru "to be [animate objects]")
  (kowe → koe "voice") (notice that an old character is also involved in this example)
  (wotoko → otoko "male")
Sino-Japanese words
  (yakuwin → yakuin "officer")
  (wen → en "Yen") (again, there is an old character used here)
  (kawoku → kaoku "house")

D-row ( Da-gyō) rule 

Again, this represents a former phonetic distinction, namely between a sound  (in  ji and  zu) and a sound  (in  di and  du). This rule applies equally to native and Sino-Japanese words, as well as a few loanwords ( Gairaigo).

Some examples:

Native words
  (adisawi → azisai "hydrangea") (notice that this example also contains a change from  wi to  i)
  (midu → mizu "water")
Sino-Japanese words
  (kaidiyo → kaizyo "release") (notice the use of Y-row rule, explained below)
  (chidu → chizu "map") (notice again that an old character form is involved)
Loanwords
  (radio → razio "radio") (this one is especially notable because it is an exceedingly rare example of a sound change that occurs in a loanword from English)

This usage is a holdover from this rule.

Y-row ( Ya-gyō) rule 

For example:

  (kyaku "guest")
  (nyojitsu "reality")
  (byakudan "sandalwood")
  (pyokopyoko "up and down")
  (sanmyaku "mountain range")
  (ryaku "abbreviation")

When a small Y-row ( Ya-gyō) kana follows an I-column kana of the S-, Z-, T-, D-, or H-rows (Sa-, Za-, Ta-, Da-, Ha-gyō), the preceding consonant is changed:

  (shoku "meal")
  (juritsu "establish")
  (cha "tea")
  (-jū "throughout [suffix]") (note that, as noted above,  ja,  ju, and  jo only occur in modern Japanese writing when a sequence  cha,  chu, or  cho is sequentially voiced, as in this example, and the pronunciation is identical to  ja,  ju, and  jo) 
  (hyaku "hundred") (note that the sequence  is pronounced  as noted above, but this difference is not reflected in any mainstream Japanese romanization system)

These three kana cannot follow A-row ( A-gyō) or W-row ( Wa-gyō) kana in this way.

So the previous examples would be written:

  (written kiyaku, but pronounced kyaku)
  (written giyugiyu, but pronounced gyugyu) (note the use of multiple iteration marks here, explained below)
  (written niyojitsu, but pronounced nyojitsu) (note the presence of an old character form here)
  (written biyaku, but pronounced byaku)
  (written piyokopiyoko, but pronounced pyokopyoko) (again, multiple iteration marks are used here)
  (written sanmiyaku, but pronounced sanmyaku)
  (written riyaku, but pronounced ryaku)
  (written shiyoku, but pronounced shoku)
  (written jiyuritsu, but pronounced juritsu)
  (written chiya, but pronounced cha)
  (written -jiyū, but pronounced -jū)
  (written hiyaku, but pronounced hyaku)

This is the only historical kana rule that does not reflect a historical pronunciation. It is also one of only two rules (along with the geminate rule) that create ambiguity for the reader (excluding the exceptions listed above for the H-row rule). For instance, the aforementioned word  (kyaku) is not differentiated in historical kana from the word  (kiyaku "agreement") when written in historical kana: both are written  (kiyaku).

Geminate ( Sokuon) rule 

In native Japanese words, this symbol can be used before kana of the K-, S-, T-, and P-rows. For example,

  (kakka "burning hotly")
  (massugu "straight")
  (kitto "surely")
  (happa "leaf")

Voiced geminates are generally prohibited by Japanese phonological rules, but they occur in a few loanwords (although they are sometimes pronounced by native speakers as if they were their voiceless counterparts). For example:

  (suraggā "slugger")
  (kiddo "kid")

Gemination can occur in Japanese for a variety of reasons. In native words, it occurs either when a historical long vowel elides, as in the aforementioned  (massugu, originally  maasugu), or randomly, as in the aforementioned  (kitto, originally  kito). These examples of the geminate consonant marker, along with those found in loanwords, are written with large  (tsu) in historical kana. Therefore,

  (written katsuka, but pronounced kakka)
  (written matsusugu, but pronounced massugu)
  (written kitsuto, but pronounced kitto)
  (written hatsupa, but pronounced happa)
  (written suratsugā, but pronounced suraggā)
  (written kitsudo, but pronounced kiddo)

In these cases, the historical usage is not reflecting any historical pronunciation. However, in Sino-Japanese words, geminate consonants are produced by different, more regular processes, and the historical usage for these words reflects historical pronunciations.

For example:

  (tekkaku "eligible", from teki + kaku)
  (gakki "semester", from gaku + ki)
  (nittei "schedule", from nichi + tei)
  (zasshi "magazine", from zatsu + shi)

In historical kana, where the geminate mark is used in the first, second, and fourth examples, a full-sized version of the original kana is used. However, in the third example,  (tsu) is used, even though an  has been elided. Therefore, the previous examples would be written:

   (tekikaku)
  (gakuki) (note the old character form)
  (nitsutei)
  (zatsusi) (note the old character form)

Occasionally, gemination may also result from a loss of a vowel after  (fu, originally ). For example,

  (hosshi "Buddhist priest", from hofu + shi)

is written

  (hotsushi)

in historical kana.

While this usage does reflect a historical pronunciation, it, like the Y-row rule, produces ambiguity. Furthermore, since these vowels are elided in some compounds but not others, this usage obscures the difference in a way that is essentially impossible to predict.

While there are a few other processes that can cause geminates in Sino-Japanese words, they all apply to N- and M-row kana, and are not written differently in historical and modern kana.

Labialized consonant ( Gōyōon) rule 

Starting in Early Middle Japanese, as more and more Chinese characters were borrowed into Japanese, the language acquired consonants fronted with glides. Those fronted with the palatal glide are described in the Y-row rule, but Early Middle Japanese also introduced consonants fronted with labial glides (i.e., CwV). Finally, while the palatal glides are written with an I-column kana, the labial glides are written with a U-column ( U-dan) kana. However, when historical kana was standardized in the Meiji Period, only the syllables with historical  were indicated. Nevertheless, some classical texts may indicate the other differences, and some resources will refer to them, so it is useful to be familiar with them. This rule applies exclusively to Sino-Japanese words. Some examples:

  (kwashi → kashi "sweets")
  (gwantan → gantan "New Year's Day")
  (kwisei → kisei "homecoming") (note the old character form)
  (gwizen → gizen "hypocrisy") (note the old character form)
  (bankwen → banken "watchdog")
  (dougwetsu → dougetsu "same month")

Labialized consonants sometimes occur in modern loanwords, and they are generally dealt with in one of two ways. Firstly, the labialized consonant may be changed from a sequence  to a sequence , both in writing and in speech. For example,

  (kuikku "quick", from English "quick" with original )

In other cases, they may be indicated with a U-column kana followed by a small A-row kana, indicating a labialized consonant. For example,

  (kwīn "queen", from English "queen" with original )

However, in these cases, an alternative version with large A-row kana generally exists (as it does in this case), indicating a monophthong pronunciation, and many speakers use the monophthong pronunciation regardless of how it is written.

There are no known exceptions to this rule, but some dialects (such as the Kagoshima dialect) preserve the distinction.

Long vowel ( Chōon) rule

Palatalized long vowel ( Kaiyōchōon) rule

Classical auxiliary verb  (mu) rule 

Modern Japanese has the moraic nasal  (n), which can represent a variety of sounds depending on what sounds come before and after it. Syllable final nasals are believed by many scholars to have existed in Proto-Japonic, but all agree that they were lost by the time of Old Japanese. They first re-appeared in Early Middle Japanese, with the introduction of Middle Chinese loanwords ending in -n and -m. Originally, syllabic n and m were phonemically and phonologically distinct, although the distinction was never written down, and was lost by Early Modern Japanese. For example,

  (kanzi, from Middle Chinese )
  (ongaku, from Middle Chinese ; originally pronounced omgaku) (note the old character form)

However, some native Japanese words also have  (n). This happens exceedingly rarely, and usually results from sound elision. An exhaustive list of every example out of all regular-use characters with the syllabic nasal in their native Japanese readings numbers only 13 characters (0.61% of the regular-use set) giving rise to 14 readings. They are

From the elision of a vowel following /m/ or /n/
From the elision of a full mora
From the preservation of an Old Japanese pre-nasalized consonant in a modern Japanese word
From abbreviation of another pronunciation on this list
  (don "porcelain bowl"), originally pronounced dom; from aforementioned  (donburi "porcelain bowl")
From multiple processes
From some semantic (rather than phonetic) process

Of course, there are also some words with this sound that either lack Chinese characters or were coined in the modern or Early Modern Japanese eras, when  (n) had been fully incorporated into the language. For example,

Regardless of how it came to be, the Japanese orthography lacked the character  (n) or any equivalent. Therefore, until the spelling reforms of 1900,  (mu) was generally used to represent the syllabic nasal.

There is one exception. In classical Japanese, there is an auxiliary verb ( jodōshi)  (mu) which indicated the volitional.

Since  (mu) is non-existent in modern Japanese, there are no dialects that preserve the distinction expressed in this rule.

Miscellaneous 

Two other significant differences involve the way that kana are used in general, rather than which kana are used. The first is that Chinese characters in classical texts are often fully marked with ruby text ( Furigana), especially in old laws and other very important documents. Ruby text is still widely used in modern Japanese, but only for characters with non-standard or ambiguous pronunciations, or sometimes in materials designed for children or foreigners. The second difference is that, especially in legal documents, Katakana were often used in the way that Hiragana are used in modern Japanese, to write out adjective and verb inflections, suffixes, and particles ( Okurigana), and for the aforementioned ruby text.

Finally, kana iteration marks were far more common in classical Japanese, and sometimes used in ways that are considered completely obsolete in modern Japanese.

For an example of a major document written in the classical style, see as an example the original text of the 1890 Meiji Constitution, which is written in classical Japanese using historical kana, old character forms, kana iteration marks, and Katakana in place of Hiragana (although it lacks universal ruby text).

Grammar

Verbs ( Dōshi)

Conjugation table 

Classical Japanese has the following verb classes and stem forms:

Inflectional form = + 

Noted that most S-irregular is the combination of a noun and 「」, for example,  「」 is a combination of the noun 「」 ('date') and 「」.

The  (yo) at the end of the imperative forms is optional in classical Japanese, although exceedingly common.

Verb class distribution 

While the many conjugation classes may seem overwhelming, most of them contain few verbs. The quadrigrade and lower bigrade classes are the primary, containing about 75% and 20% of the verbs in the language, respectively. The upper bigrade class is small (about 56 non-compound verbs), but sizable enough to make an exhaustive list difficult. The other 6 classes all together contain between 22 and 28 verbs, depending on whether basic compound verbs are included or not. An exhaustive list of these follows, which verbs in the conclusive form, as is the most-common standard. Chinese character pronunciations are indicated by hiragana in parentheses following the given character. The first spelling listed for a given verb is the most common, and those that follow are alternative spellings. Some of these spellings are generally used for slightly different connotations of the same verb, while others are simple alternatives. In later reference, only the first spelling (in pre-World War II orthography) will be used, and the transcription will be based on the historical spelling. A blank cell in one (or both) of the "modern" columns indicates that the modern spelling and/or transcription is the same as the pre-World War II version.

Table notes 

Note that these translations are glosses, and may not reflect certain nuances or rare alternative meanings.

In addition, the translations are for the classical meaning of the verb, which may differ from the modern meaning of the verb if it has survived into modern Japanese either slightly (e.g.,  ki-ru, which meant "to wear [in general]" in classical Japanese, but means "to wear [from the waist up]" in modern Japanese), or significantly (e.g.,  wi-ru, which meant "to sit" in classical Japanese, but primarily means "to be" (for animate objects) in modern Japanese). Some may have the same meaning, but a different pronunciation (e.g.,  kagami-ru "to learn from", which is generally pronounced and written  kangami-ru in modern Japanese). Also, even for those verbs which have survived with the same meaning and form, many are archaic and rarely used in modern Japanese (e.g.,  hi-ru "to sneeze", with the same modern meaning and form, but almost never used). On the other hand, some have kept the same meaning, form, and prominence into the modern language (e.g.,  mi-ru "to see", one of the oldest surviving verbs in the language and also one of the most common, both in classical and modern texts).

Finally, the "modern" transcriptions are purely orthographic.

Adjectives ( Keiyōshi) 

Classical Japanese has the following classes of adjectives and stem forms:

Table notes 

The existence of irrealis form is still a controversy. Some scholars assume that the ancient construction called  (Ku-gohō "Ku-grammar") uses the irrealis form to form nouns from verbs and adjectives; e.g.,  (yasu-shi "peaceful") →  (yasu-ke) +  (-ku) →  (yasukeku "peace of mind"). Meanwhile, others assumed the construction  (-kuba) /  (-shikuba) appears to be an irrealis form  (-ku) /  (-shiku) + particle  (-ba) (since that particle usually attaches to the irrealis form).

The compound forms are derived from continuitive form  (-ku) /  (-shiku) +  (ar-i) →  (-kuar-i) /  (-shikuar-i), which then became  (-kar-i) /  (-shikar-i) by regular sound change rules from Old Japanese. The forms then follow the R-irregular conjugation type like  (ar-i), but lack the conclusive form.

Similarly, the basic conjugations have no imperative form. It is however, relatively rare, even in classical Japanese.

Adjectival verbs ( Keiyō dōshi) 

There are the following classes for adjectival verbs:

Table notes 

Most tari-adjectival nouns are derived from Sino-Japanese vocabulary. For example,「」 is derived from 「」, a chinese word meaning “quietly, softly”.

They therefore follow the R-irregular conjugation like  (ar-i).

As with adjectives, the imperative form is rare, but is used.

Miscellaneous 

The particle  is omitted more often than in the spoken style.

See also 

Literary language

References

Further reading

External links 

Bungo Nyūmon: A Brief Introduction to Classical Japanese
Bibliography of premodern Japanese texts and translations
 Bart. "Book Review: A Grammar of Classical Japanese by Akira Komai", Monumenta Nipponica, Vol. 34, No. 4 (Winter, 1979), pp. 501-504.
Dictionaries for Classical Japanese

Archaic Japanese language
Japanese